Blandford is a historic building at 28242 Lake Terry Drive near Mount Dora, Florida, United States. On November 1, 2007, it was added to the U.S. National Register of Historic Places.

References

National Register of Historic Places in Lake County, Florida
Mount Dora, Florida